Eric Smith (born March 17, 1983) is a former American football safety for the New York Jets. He was drafted by the Jets in the third round of the 2006 NFL Draft. He played college football at Michigan State.

Professional career

Smith was selected 97th overall in the 2006 NFL Draft. Smith had been rising on many draft boards in the weeks leading up to the draft as he was praised for his instincts and physicality on the field. The Jets signed Smith to a contract on July 21, 2006. Smith recorded 27 tackles in 15 games during his rookie season. He also added two interceptions, recording his first against former Cleveland Browns quarterback Charlie Frye.

In 15 games in 2007, Smith recorded 40 tackles and 5 passes defensed.

On September 28, 2008, Smith was fined $50,000 and suspended one game because of a helmet-to-helmet collision with Anquan Boldin of the Arizona Cardinals, which caused Boldin to be hospitalized. Smith finished the season with 32 tackles, 4 passes defensed and an interception.

Smith was primarily utilized as a back up defender and on special teams in 2009. In 16 games, he recorded a career high 48 tackles, 6 pass defensed and an interception.

In the team's week two matchup against the New England Patriots in 2010, Smith delivered a hit to wide receiver Wes Welker and was flagged for hitting a defenseless receiver. Smith apologized to Welker during the game, which Welker accepted, and was later fined $7,500 by the league. He was a special teams captain in 2010.

Smith re-signed with Jets on July 30, 2011, to a three-year deal worth $7.5 million. He was a special teams captain in 2011.

Smith suffered a medial collateral ligament (MCL) injury on his left knee during the August 10, 2012, preseason loss to the Cincinnati Bengals. An MRI came back negative. Smith was eventually knocked out for the entire 2012 season. He was released from the Jets on February 19, 2013.

Coaching career
Smith was hired by the New York Jets on February 10, 2014 as a seasonal intern coach.

Smith was hired by the Buffalo Bills to be the assistant special teams coach on January 15, 2015. He served two seasons in Buffalo on Rex Ryan's staff before being dismissed by new coach Sean McDermott.

Lawsuit Against NFL
In February of 2023, Smith and nine other former players filed a lawsuit against the NFL disability board in United States Federal Court, stating they had been unfairly denied disability claims. Smith stated that he had suffered thirteen documented traumatic brain injuries and had been denied disability compensation for his “head, neck, and lumbar spine impairments” and “marked decreased shoulder range of motion, rotator cuff weakness, and moderate to severe shoulder arthritis".

References

External links
Michigan State Spartans bio
New York Jets bio
Buffalo Bills bio

1983 births
Living people
Buffalo Bills coaches
American football safeties
Michigan State Spartans football players
New York Jets coaches
New York Jets players
Players of American football from Columbus, Ohio